Avak may refer to:

People
Avak Asadourian (born 1942), a Primate of the Armenian Apostolic Church

Places
Avak crater, an impact crater southeast of Barrow, Alaska, United States
Avak-e Pain, a village in Kuhak Rural District, in the Central District of Jahrom County, Fars Province, Iran
Baron Avak, an old neighbourhood in the city center of Tabriz, Iran

Others
Operation Avak, a logistical and military operation conducted during the second truce of the 1948 Arab–Israeli War and later by the Israeli Air Force

See also
Avakian